Oxicam is a class of non-steroidal anti-inflammatory drugs (NSAIDs), meaning that they have anti-inflammatory, analgesic, and antipyretic therapeutic effects.  Oxicams bind closely to plasma proteins.  Most oxicams are unselective inhibitors of the cyclooxygenase (COX) enzymes.  The exception is meloxicam with a slight (10:1) preference for COX-2, which, however, is only clinically relevant at low doses.

The most popular drug of the oxicam class is piroxicam.  Other examples include: ampiroxicam, droxicam, pivoxicam, tenoxicam, lornoxicam, and meloxicam.

Isoxicam has been suspended as a result of fatal skin reactions.

Chemistry
The physico-chemical characteristics of these molecules vary greatly depending upon the environment.

In contrast to most other NSAIDs, oxicams are not carboxylic acids.  They are tautomeric, and can exist as a number of tautomers (keto-enol tautomerism), here exemplified by piroxicam:

Side effects

The oxicams are associated with drug-related erythema multiforme (EM), Stevens–Johnson syndrome, and toxic epidermal necrolysis (TEN).  This association is one of the reasons oxicams are not regularly prescribed.

References

Dermatoxins
Nonsteroidal anti-inflammatory drugs
Sultams